Edward Ede may refer to:
 Edward Ede Sr., English cricketer
 Edward Ede Jr., his son, English cricketer